Ayatollah Mohammad Taghi Pourmohammadi (was born 1956 in Marand, East Azerbaijan) is an Iranian Shiite Muslim cleric and politician. He is a member of the 4th and 5th Assembly of Experts from electorate East Azerbaijan. Pourmohammadi won with 359,839 votes.

References

People from Marand
Members of the Assembly of Experts
Living people
1956 births